Saint-Jean-Trolimon is a commune in the Finistère department of Brittany in north-western France.

Population
Inhabitants of Saint-Jean-Trolimon are called in French Trolimonais.

Breton language
The municipality launched a linguistic plan concerning the Breton language through Ya d'ar brezhoneg on 17 September 2004.

See also
Communes of the Finistère department
The Calvary at Tronoën

References

External links

Official website 

Mayors of Finistère Association 

Communes of Finistère